Little Thurrock is an area, ward, former civil parish and Church of England parish in the town of Grays, in the unitary authority of Thurrock, Essex. In 1931 the parish had a population of 4428.

Location
It was originally a separate settlement, but housing and other developments in the 20th century have resulted in a continuous built up area with Grays, of which Little Thurrock is now a part.

Hangman's Wood is a small wooded areas in the parish. Hangman's Wood is well known for containing numerous deneholes which were sometimes known as Cunobeline's gold mines. The origin of these deneholes is discussed by Tony Benton who concludes they were the result of chalk extraction. The deneholes are an important roosting site for rare bats.

Geology and ecology
The southern part of Little Thurrock was formerly a tidal saltmarsh. The higher, northern area is part of a  terrace extending for some miles east and west – a rich source of both gravel and chalk deposits which have been extracted for centuries. The gravel workings include the Globe Pit which is a Site of Special Scientific Interest and the location of many archaeological finds from the Clactonian period. Around Hangman's Wood and Terrel's Heath, there is little trace of the heathland habitat and associated fauna which would once have been characteristic of the area but the adjacent woodland together with the pond and wild life garden in Woodside Primary School attract a number of creatures. These include green and great spotted woodpeckers, a number of different mammals and the rare great crested newt. The trees on Terrel's Heath are mainly oaks with wild bluebells in spring time.

History

Thurrock is a Saxon name meaning "the bottom of a ship". Little Thurrock is one of three "Thurrocks", the others being West Thurrock and Grays Thurrock. Historically, Little Thurrock was also called East Thurrock and Grays Thurrock was also called Great Thurrock.

The parish church is dedicated to St. Mary the Virgin. The original building probably dates from 1170. The church was extensively restored in Victorian times.

On 1 April 1936 the parish was abolished to form Thurrock.

Schools

Little Thurrock has a number of schools, including Woodside Academy, a campus of Thurrock Special School and the Thurrock campus of South Essex College. Torrel's School was closed and later re-opened and is now known as The Gateway Academy, with a new site on Marshfoot Road in Chadwell St Mary.

Woodside Academy
Woodside Academy admits up to 90 children a year. There are two part time nursery classes, each for up to 30 children; one in the morning and one in the afternoon, and a breakfast club and after school club giving extended provision from 7.15 a.m. to 6.30 p.m. The school is responsible for admissions to the nursery classes while Thurrock Council deals with admissions for the rest of the school. Children can start in the reception class in September of the year they are five and at the same time in one of the nursery classes a year earlier. Children need to be 3 years old, at the beginning of the term, to start in the nursery.

With a long established sporting tradition in recent years the school has developed matching provision in the arts and children have regular opportunities to work with professionals from the arts world. Projects have included Chance to Dance with the Royal Ballet, Shakespeare Schools Festival, Royal Philharmonic Orchestra workshops, the creation of a totem pole with stoneware faces with Hazle Ceramics, The National Gallery Take one Picture projects, Batik wall hangings with textile artist Louise Knight and the construction of a living willow dome. All children in year 3 are currently learning orchestral strings and a number of children take private lessons on strings, wind, keyboard or guitar. Last year infant children were involved in a Creative Partnership with arts professionals to improve their writing skills through video scripting and this year a similar project is underway in year 5.
In February 2010, the school won the South Essex Girls' 7 a side football competition.

The school was graded as "good" by Ofsted in 2004, 2008 and as "good with outstanding features" in 2010. It has achieved a number of independently awarded quality marks. These include Investors in People, the Arts Mark Gold, Ormiston Education's Every Child Matters Quality Mark Gold, Quality in Study Support, the Financial Management Standard in Schools, Healthy Schools, The Active Mark and its local replacement, Thurrock Gold award, the Sustrans Bike It award and two Department for Education and Skills School Achievement Awards. The school also has entry level recognition for the International School Award and Eco Schools silver.

Local politics

There are two wards that cover Little Thurrock – Rectory Ward and Blackshots Ward, each with two councillors.

Little Thurrock – Rectory
 Rob Gledhill, Conservative (elected 4 May 2006)
 Tom Kelly, Conservative (elected 5 May 2011)

Little Thurrock – Blackshots
 Ben Maney, Conservative (elected 6 September 2001)
 Joycelyn Redsell, Conservative (elected 17 June 2004)

Notes

External links
 Ward profile -Rectory 
 Ward profile -Blackshots

Populated places in Essex
Places in Thurrock on the River Thames
Former civil parishes in Essex
Thurrock